Temitope "Topsy" Ojo (born 28 July 1985) is an English rugby union player for London Irish , and has represented England at International level. He is London Irish's all-time leading try scorer, with 73 tries in all competitions.

Career

London Irish
Ojo was born in Tottenham, London. His father, Akin Ojo, a thoracic surgeon, and his mother Bola Ojo (née Ibidapo-Obe) are from south-west Nigeria, where Temitope is a common Yoruba name. Topsy Ojo first played rugby at Burnt Oak Junior School in Sidcup where he was selected on the wing in a 'World Cup' tournament to coincide with the 1995 World Cup.  Topsy Ojo started to play 15 a-side rugby union at Dartford Grammar School at the age of eleven, going on to captain the 1st XV. He also represented Kent and London & South-East Schools at both U16 and U18. After he starting playing some under-19 trial matches and being recommended for the London Irish Academy he went on to join the Sunbury based Academy in July 2003.

He made his English club debut in September 2005 in a match against London Wasps. By April 2006 he had joined the full London Irish squad, and now plays wing.

Ojo has been tipped to replace Tom Varndell as "the hottest young finisher" by the BBC. He finished the 2005–06 Guinness Premiership season with 14 games in the starting line-up with 7 tries. That season, Ojo started in the final of the European Challenge Cup, losing to Gloucester Rugby. Despite only being at the club a few years, he has quickly become a firm favourite with the crowd.

Ojo scored a try in London Irish's first premiership game of the 2006–07 season, in which they defeated promoted Harlequins during the London Double Header at Twickenham.

Ojo scored a try against Stade Toulousain in the 2008 Heineken Cup Semi-final.

2013/14 was Topsy Ojo's testimonial season for London Irish.

In 2016/17, Ojo's first season outside the Aviva Premiership, he scored a combined total of five tries in both the RFU Championship and British and Irish Cup as Irish finished top of the league. Ojo also made punditry appearances on Sky Sports during the campaign, commenting on both legs of the RFU Championship semi-final. On 4 April 2017 Topsy agreed a new two-year deal with London Irish. The 2016/17 season also saw Ojo pass 400 points for London Irish, extending his lead as the Exiles' record try-scorer.

International career

Ojo had been a member of the England Intermediate National Academy at Bath, where he was coached by Brian Ashton and his colleagues, and went on to represent England at the under-19 2003 Six Nations, as well as the FIRA World Cup Championships. He also went on to represent England at the 2006 IRB U21 World Championship.

Ojo made his debut for the England Saxons against the USA in the 2007 Churchill Cup, where he scored the Saxons' first try. On 29 May 2007, Ojo was called up to the full England squad for the first time.

Ojo made another appearance for the England Saxons, against Italy A in Ragusa, Sicily on 9 February 2008.

On 13 May 2008, Ojo was named in Martin Johnson's first England squad selection, set to tour New Zealand that summer. He won his first cap on 14 June.

Ojo showed both pace and vision in his first game scoring twice in a game where New Zealand were dominant. His first try was an interception of a Dan Carter pass, before running nearly the length of the pitch (80m) to outpace the New Zealand full back Mils Muliaina who had to come from the other side of the field. His second try involved picking the ball up after a kick and running it under the posts. On the strength of this performance, Ojo was one of the few England backs to be retained in the starting XV for the second Test in Christchurch.

Controversy
During the 2008 summer tour to New Zealand, Ojo and several other England players were allegedly involved in an incident late at night on 14 June 2008 after a drinking session following defeat in their first match, where Topsy was implicated in what can only be interpreted as an allegation of rape, witnessed by Strettle and Brown who did not intervene.
No formal complaint was issued to the New Zealand police. However, on 10 July 2008, Ojo along with teammate Mike Brown were found guilty of misconduct and fined £500 for staying out until after 07:00 the following morning. Danny Care was found not guilty of any misconduct. David Strettle was found not guilty of any misconduct but was warned to not put himself in potentially compromising situations in future.

References

External links 
London Irish profile
England profile

1985 births
Living people
Alumni of Birkbeck, University of London
Black British sportspeople
England international rugby union players
English people of Yoruba descent
English rugby union players
English sportspeople of Nigerian descent
London Irish players
People educated at Dartford Grammar School
Rugby union players from Tottenham
Rugby union wings
Yoruba sportspeople